Maurice Van Ranst was an equestrian and Olympic champion from Belgium. He won a gold medal in vaulting with the Belgian team (together with Daniel Bouckaert and Louis Finet) at the 1920 Summer Olympics in Antwerp. He finished 4th in individual vaulting competition.

References

External links

Year of birth missing
Belgian male equestrians
Olympic equestrians of Belgium
Olympic gold medalists for Belgium
Equestrians at the 1920 Summer Olympics
Year of death unknown
Olympic medalists in equestrian
Medalists at the 1920 Summer Olympics